Edward Webb (born 1975), known by his stage name Rake Yohn, is an American television personality and former member of the CKY crew. He was a regular in the CKY videos and MTV's reality comedy series Viva La Bam and also had occasional appearances in Jackass.

Life and career
Yohn was born in 1975 in Bryn Mawr, Pennsylvania, to Australian parents. He attended Penn State University and works as a chemist specializing in synthetic materials. He is the older brother of Art Webb, an occasional CKY crew member. Yohn is known for his long hair, love for metal music, and strong dislike of mustard. His stage name was given to him by longtime friend Bam Margera.

Yohn's face is on the cover of CKY2K as well as the cover of the 1999 reissue of CKY's Volume 2 album. The image was also used on a limited edition Tech Deck released exclusively for the game Tony Hawk's Pro Skater 3. On the CKY DVD Infiltrate•Destroy•Rebuild: The Video Album, Yohn complained that "his face was on DVDs, shirts and Tech Decks, and he hasn't seen a dime for any of them."

In 2009, Yohn, his brother Art Webb, and Brandon DiCamillo provided voice-overs for the Xbox Live Arcade game Trials HD.

The history of the CKY crew according to Yohn:

In 2012, Yohn featured as a voice-over in the video game Trials Evolution.

Since 2021, Yohn is the rhythm guitarist for a band called Purplestickey.

Personal life
In March 2009, Yohn married radio personality Melissa Carr and the couple has since welcomed two sons.

Filmography
Television

Film

Other
 Viva La Bands: Volume 1 and Volume 2 (2005–2007)
 GameCasa (currently co-hosts a podcast)

References

External links
 

1975 births
21st-century American chemists
American television personalities
American stunt performers
CKY
Jackass (TV series)
Eberly College of Science alumni
People from West Chester, Pennsylvania
Living people